Telegraph is the debut album by singer-songwriter Drake Bell, released on August 23, 2005, on Nine Yards Records. It was recorded by Bell and producer Michael Corcoran, as well as a few friends in a simple home studio using a Digidesign Digi 002. The following record, It's Only Time was recorded at the time in a newly built studio, The Backhouse.

The album was released on August 23, 2005, and was issued by Michael Corcoran's label Backhouse Records and the now defunct label Nine Yards Records. Being an independently released production, it ran out of print, and was subsequently re-released on August 7, 2007.

Critical reception

Telegraph received critical acclaim for its dark tone and Bell's songwriting. AllMusic wrote in its review of the album, "He specializes in upbeat, McCartneyesque ditties fleshed out with enchanting harmony vocals and big, wet production." A writer for Ultimate Guitar Archive praised Bell's vocals on the album, writing "his voice is pleasantly raspy and there's always a sense of unapologetic know-how in his delivery, without the bratty pseudo-punk attitude that litters many a radio station".

Track listing

Additional song information
"Hollywood Girl" was performed on TRL in the TV movie Drake & Josh Go Hollywood.
Part of "Don't Preach" is also featured Drake & Josh Go Hollywood, in which Drake Bell stars. The scene shows him (as Drake Parker) performing the song at the B'nai Shalom Home for the Elderly with his band. It is also featured in the episode, "Who's Got Game?"
"Found a Way", "Down We Fall", and "Highway to Nowhere" are also on the Drake & Josh soundtrack, Drake & Josh: Songs from and inspired by the hit TV show. Drake also played "Highway to Nowhere" when he guest-starred on the Nickelodeon TV show Zoey 101. In the episode, the students of Pacific Coast Academy hire Drake to play at their school's Spring Fling. He also played "Circles" when he guest-starred on the Nickelodeon TV show All That.
The beatboxing on the song "Circles" is done by Josh Peck, Drake's co-star on Drake & Josh.

Personnel
As listed on Drake Bell's website.
Drake Bell – lead and backing vocals, rhythm guitars, keyboards
Backhouse Mike – bass guitar, lead and rhythm guitar, keyboards, backing vocals
Joey Finger – drums
Tom Kinne – bass guitar
Scott Bennett – bass guitar, drums, guitar, keyboards
DJ Eroc – scratching
Mike D'Santi – guitar
Josh Peck – beatboxing (track 3)

References

External links
[ View this album] at AllMusic

2005 debut albums
Albums recorded in a home studio
Drake Bell albums
Self-released albums